Las Heras is a small city in the oil and gas production region of Santa Cruz Province, Argentina. The province is in the Patagonia region of Argentina.

Las Heras is served by Las Heras Airport.

References

 

Populated places in Santa Cruz Province, Argentina
Populated places established in 1921